Ibrahim Sulemana may refer to:
 Ibrahim Sulemana (footballer, born 1987)
 Ibrahim Sulemana (footballer, born 2003)